Midvale is a city in Washington County, Idaho, United States. The population was 171 at the 2010 census, rising to 193 as of 2020.

History
The city was named when the valley in which it stands was called Middle Valley. The first settlers came in 1868 and in 1876 a post office and school were begun. In 1884 the Middle Valley Ditch was undertaken: in 1885 the first store was built, and in 1898 the P&IN Rail Road came through. From 1870 to 1900 stock raising was the chief industry, but today Midvale serves a diversified farming area. Midvale is the hometown of former U.S. Senator Larry Craig.

Geography

Highway

Demographics

As of the census of 2010, there were 171 people, 77 households, and 50 families residing in the city. The racial makeup of the city was 94.2% White, 4.1% Native American, 0.6% from other races, and 1.2% from two or more races. Hispanic or Latino of any race were 5.8% of the population.

There were 77 households, of which 15.6% had children under the age of 18 living with them, 55.8% were married couples living together, 3.9% had a female householder with no husband present, 5.2% had a male householder with no wife present, and 35.1% were non-families. 26.0% of all households were made up of individuals, and 13% had someone living alone who was 65 years of age or older. The average household size was 2.22 and the average family size was 2.56.

The median age in the city was 53.3 years. 13.5% of residents were under the age of 18; 7% were between the ages of 18 and 24; 16.4% were from 25 to 44; 33.9% were from 45 to 64; and 29.2% were 65 years of age or older. The gender makeup of the city was 49.7% male and 50.3% female.

Notable people
Judy Boyle, Idaho State Representative
Larry Craig, former US senator for Idaho

References

External links
  - Midvale, Idaho
 Midvale School District #443
 AirNav.com - Lee Williams Memorial Airport - Midvale, Idaho
 Airport - webcam

Cities in Idaho
Cities in Washington County, Idaho